A Feast for Odin is a Euro-style game created by Uwe Rosenberg. It is a worker placement game focused on placement of irregular cardboard polyominoes into boards owned by each player. The polyominoes are between 2 and 12 square units large, with art depicting various Viking-themed items such as beans, milk, flax, and linen. The full game is 7 rounds long, with an option for a shorter 6-round game. The rounds increase in length; the number of workers each player may use goes up by 1 each  round.

A Feast for Odin was published in 2016 by Z-Man Games. It can be played by between 1 and 4 players.

Gameplay 

Players start the game with their main board in front of them. They then go through the 12 phases illustrated on the round overview shown, and repeat until the game is over. During a player's turn, they take turns clockwise, adding their workers to unoccupied spaces on the action board. Players retrieve Vikings each round during the Retrieve Vikings phase.

Expansions 
The game has received one major expansion, A Feast for Odin: The Norwegians (2018).

Reception
An Ars Technica review states that the game is a "cohesive, deep, and fun experience". Reviewing for Tabletop Gaming, Matt Jarvis praises the theme, strategy, mechanics, and tension, concluding that it was a "rich, hugely rewarding experience".

References

External links 
 A Feast for Odin at BoardGameGeek

Board games introduced in 2016
Uwe Rosenberg games
Worker placement board games
Vikings